Ryczywół  is a village in Oborniki County, Greater Poland Voivodeship, in west-central Poland. It is the seat of the gmina (administrative district) called Gmina Ryczywół.

The village has a population of 2,000.

References

Villages in Oborniki County